Kayri Havens is an American botanist with expertise in reproductive ecology and rare, threatened, and endangered species conservation, including seed banking. She is the Medard and Elizabeth Welch Director of Plant Science and Conservation at the Chicago Botanic Garden. Havens is the co-director of Project Budburst, a community science project that facilitates the collection of plant phenology observations. In 2019, she was the recipient of the American Horticultural Society's Liberty Hyde Bailey Award for her achievements in plant conservation.

References

Botanists active in North America
20th-century American botanists
21st-century American botanists
Living people
Year of birth missing (living people)